The Ford Crestline is an automobile which was produced by Ford in the United States for models years 1952 to 1954.

1952
The Crestline was introduced as the top trim level of the 1952 Ford range, above the intermediate-level Customline and base level Mainline. It was offered in Victoria, Sunliner and Country Squire versions with 2-door hardtop, 2-door convertible and 4-door station wagon body styles respectively. Crestlines were offered only with a   "flathead" V8 engine.

1953
The Crestline was updated with minor styling and trim changes for 1953. It retained its position as the top trim level in the Ford range while body styles and engine availability also remained unchanged.

1954
For 1954 the Crestline was again updated with minor styling and trim changes. Fordor Sedan and Skyliner versions were added, the latter being a 2-door hardtop with a tinted acrylic glass panel in the front section of the roof. 13,144 were sold in the single year of production, more than the two years of Crown Victoria Skyliner production that would follow. New  straight-six and  overhead valve V8 engines were offered.

The Crestline was replaced by the Ford Fairlane in the 1955 Ford range.

References

Crestline
Motor vehicles manufactured in the United States